Catalyst is a 2002 novel by American writer Laurie Halse Anderson, published September 2002 by Viking Press. 

The book tells the story of Kate Malone, a preacher's daughter and high school student who is excellent in chemistry and aspires to attend the Massachusetts Institute of Technology (MIT), but faces multiple tragic circumstances, ranging from rejection by MIT, to her neighbor Teri Litch's house burning down at the end of her senior year. The book is set in the same fictional setting as Anderson's previous novel Speak.

Reception 
Catalyst received positive reviews from The Book Report, Publishers Weekly, Booklist, and Kirkus. Teenreads.com put Catalyst on its Ultimate Teen Reading List.

The book also received the following accolades:

 American Library Association (ALA) Best Books for Young Adults Top Ten (2003)
 ALA Selected Audiobooks for Young Adults (2007)

References 

2002 American novels
Novels by Laurie Halse Anderson
American young adult novels